Body and Soul is an album by the Al Cohn and Zoot Sims recorded in 1973 for the Muse label.

Reception 

The Allmusic review by Scott Yanow stated "Cohn and Sims still had very complementary sounds and personalities, so their collaboration on Body and Soul (Muse) holds its own against their earlier dates. ... This is pleasing and frequently lyrical music". On All About Jazz Joel Roberts called it "a thoroughly enjoyable, low-key blowing session featuring the two tenor titans backed by an excellent veteran rhythm section" and noted "Cohn and Sims display that rare musical affinity that only years of playing together can breed".

Track listing 
 "Doodle Oodle" (Billy Byers) – 6:54
 "Emily" (Johnny Mandel, Johnny Mercer) – 7:19
 "Samba Medley: Recado Bossa Nova/The Girl from Ipanema/One Note Samba" (Djalma Ferreira/Antônio Carlos Jobim/Jobim) – 7:59
 "Mama Flossie" (Al Cohn) – 5:43
 "Body and Soul" (Johnny Green, Frank Eyton, Edward Heyman, Robert Sour) – 5:38
 "Jean" (Rod McKuen) – 6:03
 "Blue Hodge" (Gary McFarland) – 7:03

Personnel 
 Al Cohn – tenor saxophone
 Zoot Sims – tenor saxophone, soprano saxophone
 Jaki Byard – piano
 George Duvivier – bass
 Mel Lewis – drums

References 

1974 albums
Muse Records albums
Al Cohn albums
Zoot Sims albums
Albums produced by Don Schlitten